NK Draga is a Croatian football club from Mošćenička Draga on the Croatian coast. The team won the Treća HNL West Division in 2003–04.

Honours 
 Treća HNL – West:
Winners (1): 2003–04

References 

Association football clubs established in 1924
Football clubs in Croatia
Football clubs in Primorje-Gorski Kotar County
1924 establishments in Croatia